Shirokov is a Russian masculine surname, its feminine counterpart is Shirokova. It may refer to

Aleksejs Širokovs (born 1981), Latvian ice hockey player
Margarita Shirokova (born 1991), Russian football goalkeeper
Maksim Shirokov (born 1994), Russian football forward
Maksims Širokovs (born 1982), Latvian ice hockey player, brother of Aleksejs
 Pavel Shirokov (1893–1963), Russian poet
 Roman Shirokov (born 1981), Russian footballer
 Sergei Shirokov (born 1986), Russian ice hockey player
 Yurii Shirokov (1921–1980), Russian physicist and mathematician

Russian-language surnames